Jean Cameron Hill (born 15 July 1964) is a British swimmer. Hill competed at the 1984 Summer Olympics and the 1988 Summer Olympics. At the ASA National British Championships she won the 200 metres breaststroke title in 1991.

References

External links
 

1964 births
Living people
British female swimmers
Olympic swimmers of Great Britain
Swimmers at the 1984 Summer Olympics
Swimmers at the 1988 Summer Olympics
Sportspeople from Larkhall
Commonwealth Games medallists in swimming
Commonwealth Games silver medallists for Scotland
Swimmers at the 1986 Commonwealth Games
20th-century British women
Medallists at the 1986 Commonwealth Games
Scottish female swimmers